EE Times (Electronic Engineering Times) is an electronics industry magazine published in the United States since 1972.  EE Times is currently owned by AspenCore, a division of  Arrow Electronics since August 2016.

Since its acquisition by AspenCore, EE Times has seen major editorial and publishing technology investment and a renewed emphasis on investigative coverage. New features include The Dispatch, which profiles frontline engineers and unpacks real-life design problems and their solutions in technical yet conversational reporting.

Ownership and status
EE Times was launched in 1972 by Gerard G. Leeds of CMP Publications Inc.  In 1999, the Leeds family sold CMP to United Business Media for $900 million.  After 2000, EE Times moved more into web publishing. The shift in advertising from print to online began to accelerate in 2007, and the periodical shed staff to adjust to the downturn in revenue.

In July 2013, the digital edition migrated to UBM TechWeb's DeusM community platform.

On June 3, 2016, UBM announced that EE Times, along with the rest of its electronics media portfolio (EDN, Embedded.com, TechOnline, and Datasheets.com), was being sold to AspenCore Media, a company owned by Arrow Electronics, for $23.5 million. The acquisition was completed on August 1, 2016.

Availability
EE Times is free for qualified design engineers, managers, and business and corporate management in the electronics industry. It is also available online; the EE Times website offers news, columns, and features articles for semiconductor manufacturing, communications, electronic design automation, electronic engineering, technology, and products. In November 2012, UBM Electronics announced that the December 2012 issue of EE Times would be the last in print. In 2013, EE Times will be an online product only.

In 2018, EE Times rolled out a  refreshed website, resurrected its print edition in Europe, and launched a new radio show, EE Times On Air, available an hour after the live broadcast as a podcast.

References

External links 
 EE Times
 EE Times Europe
 EE Times Asia
 EE Times China
 EE Times Japan
 EE Times India

Online magazines published in the United States
Electrical and electronic engineering magazines
Magazines established in 1972
Magazines established in 2012
Magazines published in San Francisco
Online magazines with defunct print editions
Engineering magazines
Defunct magazines published in the United States